Peter II (October 1946 – 27 June 1947) was a black cat who was employed as Chief Mouser to the Cabinet Office in 1946 and 1947, during the government of Clement Attlee. Peter II assumed the role on an unofficial basis from his predecessor, Nelson. The young kitten served a truncated term as mouser; some six months after his appointment, he was struck by a car driven by R. B. Bisgood in Whitehall at 3:15 AM, and died shortly after.

He was succeeded by Peter III, in August 1947.

See also
 List of individual cats

References 

1946 animal births
1947 animal deaths
Individual cats in England
Individual cats in politics
Working cats
Chief Mousers to the Cabinet Office
Road incident deaths in London